"Hold Me in Your Arms" is a song written and performed by Rick Astley. Released as a single in 1989, it reached No. 10 in the UK Singles Chart in February 1989. It was the third single from his album of the same name.

In 2019, Astley recorded and released a 'Reimagined' version of the song for his album The Best of Me, which features a new piano arrangement.

Critical reception
In an ironic review of 4 February 1989 the Phil Cheeseman, reviewer of British music newspaper Record Mirror, chided the song for lack of class and recommended the singer take a break. Mick Mercer of Melody Maker expressed similar opinion on single. Julianne Regan of All About Eve also wasn't really impressed by "Hold Me in Your Arms" by saying "this song is exactly what you'd expect from him" in her capsule review for New Musical Express.

Track listing
7" single 
 "Hold Me In Your Arms" – 4:32 
 "I Don't Want to Be Your Lover" – 3:58

Chart performance

References

1980s ballads
1989 singles
Rick Astley songs
Songs written by Rick Astley
RCA Records singles
1988 songs
Pop ballads
Song recordings produced by Phil Harding (producer)